Auguste Jubé, baron de La Perelle (12 May 1765 – 1 July 1824) was a French general, politician and historiographer.

Publications 
1794: Couplets-impromptus au brave Marc Tancogne, de la commune d'Agen, soldat au 71e régiment d'infanterie, chantés à la fin du repas que lui ont donné les représentans du peuple, députés du département de Lot-et-Garonne, et leurs amis C. St-C. B... et Aug. J...
1797: Détail exact des ceremonies qui auront lieu aujour'hui décadi au Luxembourg pour la réception du général Buonaparte, porteur, de la ratification du Traité de paix qu'il a conclu avec l'empereux: désignation des hymnes qui ont été donnés pour la publication de la paix
1800: Couplets patriotiques chantés à l'inauguration du nouveau pavillon national, dans la rade de Cherbourg, le 1er prairial
 Discours prononcé par Aug. Jubé: dans la séance extraordinairement [du] Tribunat convoquée le 4 nivose an 9
1800: Observations rapides par Auguste Jubé, contre le projet de loi relative aux Archives nationales: Tribunat. Séance du 11 frimaire an 9
 Aux habitants du district de Cherbourg. 1er entretien patriotique
1803: Rapport fait au nom de la section de l'intériour, sur la concession d'un droit de péage pour l'amélioration de la navigation du Tarn: Tribunat. Séance du 16 floréal an 11 
1805: La Victoire d'Austerlitz, chant de reconnaissance
1805: Histoire des guerres des gaulois et des français en Italie: avec le tableau des événemens civils et militaires qui les accompagnèrent, et leur influence sur la civilisation et les progrès de l'esprit humain, Volume 2
1805: Histoire des Guerres des Gaulois et des Français en Italie, Volume 5
1814: Hommage des Français à l'empereur Alexandre: de la nécessité de transmettre à la postérité le souvenir des bienfaits de l'empereur Alexandre et de ses augustes Alliés, et des moyens de signaler la reconnaissance des Français : [Paris, 3 avril 1814]
1816: Lettre à M. le Vte de Châteaubriant... concernant un pamphlet intitulé : "De la Monarchie selon la Charte"...
1816: Nouvelle lettre du chevalier de l'union à sm. le vicomte de Chateaubriand, sur sa nouvelle proposition; suivie d'une analyse du Tableau politique de l'Allemagne
1817: Des essais de M. Scheffer, sur quatre grandes questions politiques, et particulièrement de son opinion relative aux armées
1817: Émile Vadé, petit cousin de Guillaume, à Madame Duchaume, marchande coquetière de Pontoise
1817: Encore un Concordat: Notes rapides sur les articles d'une loi proposée pour l'enregistrement et la publication d'un nouveau concordat
1818: Quelques mots sur la proclamation de m. le vicomte de Chateaubriand
1818: Le Post-Scriptum
1818: Lettre d'un Français à lord Stanhope, et réflexions sur l'évènement arrivé à lord Wellington, dans la nuit du 10 au 11 février
1818: Le Chansonnier des Graces, Pour 1819: Avec les Airs nouveaux gravés
1819: La cour-pléniere des Iles de parlas, ou, M.DCCC. XIXe. chapitre de la vie Pantagruel: morceau d'histoire
1820: Le temple de la gloire ou les fastes militaires de la France depuis le règne de Louis XIV jusqu'à nos jours, Volume 1
1820: Le temple de la gloire ou les fastes militaires de la France: depuis le règne de Louis XIV jusquá̀ nos jours, Volume 2
1820: Le temple de la gloire, ou, Fastes militaires de la France: depuis le règne de Louis XIV jusqu'à nos jours : contenant le récit des principaux faits d'armes, tant sur terre que sur mer
1830: Péroraison qui devait être prononcée par l'un des défenseurs du maréchal Ney... en décembre 1815, publiée par la veuve du général Jubé.
1835: Histoire des campagnes des Français de 1643 à 1815, par le général Jubé. Nouvelle édition, continuée jusqu'à la fin du règne de Napoléon...

Sources 
 
 Louis Gabriel Michaud, Biographie universelle ancienne et moderne, Volume 21, 1858

External links 
 Auguste Jubé de La Perelle on data.bnf.fr

French generals
1765 births
1824 deaths
Prefects of Gers
French historiographers
Commandeurs of the Légion d'honneur
Knights of the Order of Saint Louis
Barons of the First French Empire